Zaglav  is a port village in Croatia. It is connected by the D125 highway and by ferry.

Populated places in Zadar County
Dugi Otok